Spaulding is an unincorporated community in the town of City Point, Jackson County, Wisconsin, United States.

Notes

Unincorporated communities in Jackson County, Wisconsin
Unincorporated communities in Wisconsin